Aguinaldo Braga de Jesus, better known simply as Aguinaldo Braga (born 9 August 1974 in Moeda, Brazil) is a Brazilian-Macedonian retired international football player.

International career 
He made his senior debut for North Macedonia in an April 2002 friendly match against Finland in Prilep and has earned a total of 6 caps, scoring no goals. His final international was a September 2003 European Championship qualification match against England.

Honours
Vardar Skopje
Macedonian Prva Liga: 2001–02
Macedonian Cup: 2007

References

External links
 
 Short career story at Planotatico. 

1974 births
Living people
Sportspeople from Minas Gerais
Brazilian emigrants to North Macedonia
Association football fullbacks
Association football midfielders
Brazilian footballers
Macedonian footballers
North Macedonia international footballers
América Futebol Clube (MG) players
Uberlândia Esporte Clube players
Clube Atlético Mineiro players
FK Makedonija Gjorče Petrov players
FK Vardar players
Aris Thessaloniki F.C. players
A.O. Kerkyra players
FK Teteks players
FK Cementarnica 55 players
Macedonian First Football League players
Super League Greece players
Macedonian Second Football League players
Brazilian expatriate footballers
Macedonian expatriate footballers
Expatriate footballers in Greece
Macedonian expatriate sportspeople in Greece